Horné Srnie is a village and municipality in Trenčín District in the Trenčín Region of north-western Slovakia.

History
In historical records the village was first mentioned in 1439.

Geography
The municipality lies at an altitude of 257 metres and covers an area of 27.262 km². It has a population of about 2876 people.

Points of interest
On Nad Oborou a mountain which belongs to Horné Srnie, there is a 122 metres tall broadcasting tower.

Genealogical resources

The records for genealogical research are available at the state archive "Statny Archiv in Bratislava, Slovakia"

 Roman Catholic church records (births/marriages/deaths): 1789-1896 (parish A)

See also
 List of municipalities and towns in Slovakia

External links
https://web.archive.org/web/20070513023228/http://www.statistics.sk/mosmis/eng/run.html
Surnames of living people in Horne Srnie

Villages and municipalities in Trenčín District